The 1853 Liverpool by-election was held due to the previous election of two Conservative MPs being declared void.  It resulted in the election of the Conservative MPs Charles Turner and Thomas Horsfall.

References

1853 elections in the United Kingdom
Liverpoool, 1853
1853 in England
1850s in Liverpool